The 2014 Morelos Open was a professional tennis tournament played on outdoor hard courts. It was the 1st edition  was part of the 2014 ATP Challenger Tour, offering prize money of $75,000 on 17–23 February 2014.

ATP singles main draw entrants

Seeds

Other entrants 
The following players received wildcards into the singles main draw:
  Tigre Hank
  Luis Patiño
  Miguel Ángel Reyes-Varela
  Rogelio Siller

The following players used protected ranking to gain entry into the singles main draw :
  Daniel Kosakowski

The following players received entry from the qualifying draw:
  Dean O'Brien
  Henrique Cunha
  Juan Carlos Spir
  Giovanni Lapentti

Champions

Singles 

  Gerald Melzer def.  Víctor Estrella Burgos, 6–1, 6–4

Doubles 

  Andrej Martin /  Gerald Melzer def.  Alejandro Moreno Figueroa /  Miguel Ángel Reyes-Varela, 6–2, 6–4

External links 
 Results
 Singles results

2014
2014 ATP Challenger Tour
Hard court tennis tournaments
February 2014 sports events in Mexico
Mex